The Canadian Rally Championship is an automobile rallying championship sanctioned by the Canadian Association of RallySport (CARS) held since 1957 in Canada.

Canadian rallying history

The Canadian Rally Championship (CRC) is Canada's only national rallying series.  2007 marked the 50th anniversary of the Canadian Rally Championship, making it the longest running motorsport series in Canada. It has been run continuously since 1957 when Leslie Chelminski and Les Stanley from Montreal shared the very first national rally title in a factory-prepared Volkswagen Karmann-Ghia. In the early days, the rally championship was based on a navigational (also called time-speed-distance or TSD) rally series which, at times, had as many as twenty events in the series.  The most notable Canadian car rallies in those days were the Canadian Winter Rally and the Shell 4000.  Some Rally champions from the TSD era include Art Dempsey, Bill Silvera, and Canadian Motorsport Hall of Fame inductees John Bird, Paul S. Manson, and Bruce D. Simpson.

As the sport gradually changed and adopted the European "stage" format, performance rallying became part of the Canadian motorsport picture.  As opposed to TSD rallies, where competitors are required to follow the organizer's schedule, travel below posted speed limits and otherwise adhere to the rules of the public roads they are traveling on, performance rallies incorporate high speed "special stages" on roads closed to vehicles other than the rally cars, which must be specially prepared with full safety equipment. In 1973, the Canadian Rally Championship became based solely on stage rallies, including the Rally of the Tall Pines, which is still the premier event, and is held in November every year.

2018 CRC Season
The CRC consists of 7 national events for 2018. These events take place on gravel or snow-covered roads from coast to coast.

2018 Event Calendar

2017 Drivers' Championship Final Standings

2017 Co-Drivers' Championship Final Standings

2017 Manufacturers' Championship Final Standings

Champions

Canadian Performance Rally Lifetime Standings

The following standings are based on an individual's placings in the first six overall positions on all Canadian Championship Performance Rallies from 1973 to 2016.
There are 13 drivers who have attained Grand Master status (>2000 points)

External links
The Canadian Association of Rallysport web site

Rally racing series
Rally Championship
Rally